Andrzej Wiercinski (born March 10, 1961 in Białystok, Poland) is a Hermeneutician, Philosopher,  and Theologian. As the transdisciplinary thinker, he is Professor of Liberal Arts, Faculty of Artes Liberales at the University of Warsaw, President-Founder (2001) of the International Institute for Hermeneutics (IIH), and President of Agora Hermeneutica (IIH).

Life 
Wierciński completed his M.A. with distinction in Theology (Catholic University of Lublin, 1984), and was ordained a priest for the Archdiocese of Lublin April 4, 1985. In 1990, he took his doctorate in philosophy with Stanisław Wielgus at the Catholic University of Lublin with a dissertation, Die scholastischen Vorbedingungen der Metaphysik Gustav Siewerths: Eine historisch-kritische Studie mit Bezug auf die Seinsvergessenheitstheorie von Martin Heidegger. His second doctorate was in Theology with Gerhard-Ludwig Müller at Ludwig-Maximilians-Universität in Munich with a dissertation, Der Dichter in seinem Dichtersein: Versuch einer philosophisch-theologischen Deutung des Dichterseins am Beispiel von Czesław Miłosz. In 2007, Wierciński took his Habilitation in Philosophy of Religion at Albert-Ludwigs-Universität in Freiburg i.Br. with a monograph, Hermeneutics between Philosophy and Theology: The Imperative to Think the Incommensurable. After obtaining a venia legendi in Philosophy of Religion, he was Privatdozent before becoming in 2012 ausserplanmäßiger Professor (Professor extra numerum) of Philosophy of Religion at the Albert-Ludwigs-Universität Freiburg. From 2015 to 2021 he was Professor of General Education and Philosophy of Education, Faculty of Education, University of Warsaw. In 2020, Wierciński received the title of Professor rerum socialium in Education (Decision of the President of the Republic of Poland of September 28, 2020). In 2021, he was awarded the honor of Professor honoris causa at the IIH and received the 2021 Blue Diamond Hermes Award: An Outstanding Contribution to Phenomenological Hermeneutics (IIH). Since 2022 he is Professor of Liberal Arts, Faculty of Artes Liberales, University of Warsaw.

Work 
Wierciński has generated research accomplishments in his subject areas that demonstrate his scholarly expertise both in the range of his works and their broad, contentful composition. He understands hermeneutics as a specific mindset of openness that admits neither a priori nor apodictic demarcations between domains of knowledge but instead sits decidedly between them to overcome the compartmentalization of knowledge forms from each other. Despite the postmodern format of this hermeneutic in-between—which of course will not be raised to a trans-regional, conceptually achievable absolutism—Wierciński positions hermeneutics within the horizon of a human being’s specific ability to attain truth, which actualizes itself in the history of knowledge and its forms. He understands the philosophy of religion as the hermeneutic mediation between the incommensurable knowledge forms of religion/theology and philosophy, which are not separated from one another but rather allude to one another both genealogically and constitutively.

To bring theology and philosophy into conversation with each other, Wierciński has edited an entire row of anthologies, organized conferences, and taken part in many himself with talks. The hermeneutic in-between, which he takes up under numerous titles in lectures and publications, emblematically indicates a theoretical form and his marked talent for organizing and facilitating scholarly endeavors.

In teaching and research, Wierciński is primarily concerned with lingually oriented phenomenological hermeneutics, with the approaches of Hans-Georg Gadamer, Paul Ricoeur, and the hermeneutic reappropriation of the metaphysics of the Middle Ages, in conversation with Martin Heidegger, Gustav Siewerth, German Idealism—especially Schelling—as well as with the hermeneutics of education, communication, medicine, psychoanalysis, law, and architecture. The main focus of his writing has been the hermeneutic retrieval of medieval metaphysics. His hermeneutics of education and hermeneutics of medicine contribute to a better understanding of the relationship between human social sciences and natural sciences and their impact on contemporary society. As a prolific author, an accomplished manager, and knowledge facilitator, he serves on the advisory boards of many international societies and on the editorial boards of international academic journals.

Wierciński received the 2019 Hermes Award: A Book of the Year in Phenomenological Hermeneutics (IIH) for his two books, Hermeneutics of Education: Exploring and Experiencing the Unpredictability of Education and Existentia Hermeneutica: Understanding as the Mode of Being in the World that are the outstanding accomplishments of his hermeneutic path.

Existentia Hermeneutica 
Wierciński unrivaled work of scholarship on our being in the world with others explores the multifarious ways in which philosophy, theology, and poetry meaningfully interweave. His exhilarating meditation on the human condition ingeniously captures the ubiquity of the hermeneutic character of human existence. By thinking-the-difference, hermeneutics displays its unique welcoming gesture toward investigating the heterogeneous nature of human thinking. Recognizing the empowerment of thinking that arises from Differenzdenken, existentia hermeneutica powerfully rejuvenates philosophical hermeneutics’ inimitable contribution to the Humanities. Addressing a vast range of themes, the belonging-together of language and understanding, forgetfulness of Being, self-understanding, metaphysics, Trinity, a-theology, and the pivotal Incarnation as the empowerment of thinking-the-difference, Wierciński draws on insights from impressively dexterous readings of the whole host of thinkers: Martin Heidegger, Hans-Georg Gadamer, Paul Ricoeur, Ignatius of Antioch, Thomas Aquinas, Augustine, and Richard of St. Victor, Hans Urs von Balthasar, as well as the less known Gustav Siewerth and Bernhard Welte. Orchestrating diverse voices, Wierciński places his prescient reflection on the lingual character of understanding at the heart of the book. 

Following Heidegger, he cogently asserts that language and human understanding belong together: “Human Dasein resides within language: ‘Language is the house of Being.’” Wierciński’s captivating explication of the relationship between language and understanding comes to its climax in a superb gloss on Gadamer’s revalidation of Augustine’s verbum interius. Arguing that Gadamer commences an original engagement with the nature of language as situated in the onto-theological perspective, Wierciński makes a new foray into our apprehension of language, providing a great stimulus for contemporary hermeneutics to rediscover and rearticulate the deep-seated connections between philosophical and theological discourses. Acknowledging the importance of Gadamer’s appropriation of Augustine, Wierciński sensitizes us, at the same time, to hermeneutics’ vital concern of reaching out for understanding as both rooted in and transcending Tradition. Dwelling in the hermeneutic in-between of the past and the present, experiencing our being as finite, contingent, and provisional, continually facing the challenges of understanding, we partake in Being’s disclosing itself to us in the back-and-forth movement of the concealed (das Verborgene) and the unconcealed (das Entborgene), enacted in and through language. Wierciński affirms that the imperative to understand and interpret, which is embedded in our embracement and dynamic responding to the dialectic of familiarity and strangeness, indicate the unfolding of human existence as existentia hermeneutica, i.e., existentia interpretativa. In the overwhelming struggle to make sense of our being-in-the-world, we incessantly attempt to describe, re-describe, and interpret reality as profoundly stranded between finitude and infinity. The task of interpretation encompasses lived experience, and thus the possible risk of misinterpretation and misunderstanding. 

Locating understanding in the practical dimension of life, in our situatedness, Wierciński potently revives the significance of phronesis for hermeneutics, sensitizing us to the intimate connections between the unique unrepeatability of the self, his/her existential situation, and radical responsibility (re-spondeo). Pondering the endeavor of hermeneutic to position us in the horizon of thinking about what happens to us and in us when we understand, Wierciński makes an enticing recourse to poetry which he deems “a zealous search for a ‘magic formula’ in which the whole truth about our existence could be accommodated and shine out brightly.” His splendid interpretations of poetry by Hölderlin, Celan, Rilke, and Miłosz that both intersperse and are an integral part of his philosophical-theological discourse aptly show that the poetic word is the portentous locus of the disclosures of Being. Integrating the miscellaneous insights afforded by a stunningly meticulous interrogation of the pregnant but often overlooked and underrated intersections of philosophy, theology, and poetry, the hermeneutics of facticity of being in the world with others  is a superb achievement that remains attuned to its momentous, interdisciplinary, and far-reaching character.

Hermeneutics of Education 
“Andrzej Wierciński is currently the most outstanding author in Poland who represents philosophical pedagogy, on the one hand, and the philosophy of educational practice, on the other, while combining hermeneutic and critical perspectives. His cognitive maturity is expressed by the ability to move at ease across academic disciplines, which are usually treated as separate and even actively and nonchalantly severed from each other to the detriment of the intellectual culture of the Academy. In his interpretations and analyses, Wierciński connects the academic areas fraught up with current pseudo-reforms and preserved as such in segregated and isolated circles. He protected his intellectual path from the pressures which dichotomize differences and divisions, and which weaken, at the same time, the quality of the possible rooting in the contemporary intellectual culture of its polymorphic form, which always requires fusions as transdisciplinarity and not just interdisciplinarity.” (Witkowski 2020, 120)

Wierciński’s hermeneutics of education is a compelling and thought-provoking response to our being-in-the-world in its formation and transformation dynamics. Instead of offering one more examination of some voguish teaching methodologies or treating us to a purely theoretical stance, Wierciński places hermeneutic hospitality and the prodigy of our being a gift to one another in the very center of educational endeavor, sensitizing us thus to its dialogical, reciprocal, and phronetic dimension.  Advocating for the relevance of the hermeneutic triad of understanding, explaining, and applying (subtilitas intelligendi, explicandi et applicandi) for the educational enterprise, Wierciński focuses on application (An-wendung, turning toward something) that results from a dialogic encounter in the teaching environment, in its fundamental and compelling openness to the inexorable μετάνοια. In the fusion of the horizons of the teacher and the student (Horizontverschmelzung), education happens as a hermeneutic conversation and opens a unique possibility to discover the otherwise unfeasible. As Wierciński evocatively underlines, education in its conversational character allows us to unravel those areas of meaning and unknot those problems that we would not be able to solve on our own. Therefore, hermeneutic education is the time of a momentous unveiling (revelatio), in which a given phenomenon speaks to us differently each time we undertake the invaluable task of understanding in the true spirit of Gadamer’s oft-quoted dictum of immer-anders-verstehen. In its nourishing and strengthening of our need to understand and interpret, education cannot be narrowed down to an instrumental multiplication of the possible and versatile answers to a given question or a facile accumulation of data. Hermeneutic education shifts the accent from a mere quest for knowledge to persistent but also life-affirming and life-changing cultivation of a willingness to understand, which calls on us to welcome unpredictability and risk. Instead of eliminating and suffocating different and complicated voices, hermeneutic education stimulates and fosters patient encounters with what needs to be understood without shortcuts and cutoffs.

Fostering Heidegger’s crucial distinction between calculative and contemplative modes of thinking (berechnendes and besinnliches Denken), Wierciński encourages us to follow the path of vita contemplativa. He fleshes out its unquestionable positivity by excellently combining the medieval care of the soul, encapsulated in St Bonaventura’s plea to expand on our contemplative work by sharing the fruits of contemplation (contemplata tradere) with the hermeneutic call to implement that which has been learned (Hermeneutik im Vollzug). Wierciński magnifies his most precious invitation to cultivate meditative thinking by sensitizing us to the beauty of the poetic word. His penetrating and erudite interpretations of Miłosz, Herbert, T.S. Eliot, Hölderlin, Szymborska, and Rilke enhance our imaginative response to Being disclosing itself to us, as well as help preclude our falling prey to the narcissistic and complacent apprehension of the self. With a hand of a virtuoso, Wierciński brings into conversation the insights of contemporary hermeneutic anthropology, philosophical hermeneutics, phenomenology, and psychoanalysis, as well as bridges them with the theological traditions of  St Augustine and St Aquinas, inspiring us to see the indispensability of the hermeneutic dialogue of the past and the present and to recognize the power of the pedagogical enterprise as both embedded in the wisdom of the past and as happening in the now (hic et nunc). Enthusing us to apprehend the profundity of the event (Eregnis) of education as the genuine locus educativus of our intellectual and spiritual growth, Wierciński rejuvenates in us the critical and exhilarating truth that when we understand, we always self-understand (Verstehen ist Sichverstehen), and that education is always self-education (Erziehung ist Sich-Erziehen). Facing and honoring the reality of our vulnerability and fragility, l’homme capable, agissant et souffrant is a being capable of a more thoughtful and compassionate response to the Other (répondre à la vulnérabilité) in situations which call for phronetic wisdom. In its intensely sensitive and consequential attunement to the possibilities inhering in the eventing of education, Wierciński’s remarkable tour de force encourages us to rejoice in the inexhaustibility of understanding and the beauty of the unpredictability of what happens to us and in us when we learn and understand.

Hermeneutic Philosophy of Religion 
Wierciński situates the contemporary debate regarding the relationship between philosophy and theology beyond Athens and Jerusalem. The original antinomy of Tertullian collapsed in light of the undeniably theological development of modern Western philosophy. The intellectual legacies of the Middle Ages, the Renaissance, and the Enlightenment demonstrate that philosophy and theology are inseparably entrenched. Wierciński observantly reveals that the representative theologians of the twentieth century were strongly philosophically informed. The theological profundity of Bultmann, Barth, Rahner, and von Balthasar, each in his own way, was a profundity of classical German philosophy.

On the other hand, philosophy has theology to thank for its unmistakable radiance. Modern philosophers like Kant, Hegel, and Schelling are unthinkable without a theological background, not to mention postmoderns, like Heidegger or Levinas. The necessity to pose philosophical questions and contemplate natural theology became a dominating concern for Christianity and Western philosophy. For Wierciński, hermeneutics thoughtfully pursues a degree of mediation between the two poles of opposed misunderstandings of religion and the secular world. Hermeneutics comes to the aid of a strained relationship like a middleman and becomes ever more conscious of the finitude and historicity of understanding. The divide between theology and philosophy in the Western tradition is simply not a problem that must be overcome. In fact, this divide gave rise to a fruitful legacy that provoked both philosophy and theology to pose hermeneutic questions. On the basis of hermeneutics, Wierciński invites a rejection of Heidegger’s call for a radical separation between philosophy and theology. Such a separation is hermeneutically untenable. Independently of how strictly the disciplines attempt to maintain their distance from one another, the opposing influence cannot be avoided. It is already a historical reality. Hermeneutics calls for new and renewed consideration of the problematic connections of theology and philosophy that needs to happen at different levels. Philosophy and theology are not simply static disciplines that must somehow become methodologically associated, but historical disciplines with their own distinctive intellectual histories. The hermeneutic-critical apparatus, narrative identity in particular, is necessary to reclaim, in a constructive articulation, the tradition of respect and connection between philosophy and theology. The space that is to be established anew between philosophy and theology thanks to the contemplation of the incommensurable is an invitation to hermeneutics. That which happens in the no-man’s land between the two disciplines is hermeneutics and can only be hermeneutics. It is a hermeneutics between the courage to inquire and the humility to listen. Wierciński claims no final judgment regarding the single proper connection of philosophy and theology but attempts rather to show another way, a way that is to negotiate between the two disciplines. The sole possibility of disclosing this way lies in actually practicing hermeneutics. The incommensurability of philosophy and theology yearns for a myriad of interpretations. Philosophy and theology cannot eliminate such an open space for the manifold of interpretations, not even with reference to the distance between the two. Neither can one forbid the other from understanding and interpreting their connection differently.

The belonging-together of philosophy and theology discloses that Western philosophy and the theological tradition have developed, historically, with and alongside one and another. Throughout intellectual history, there were movements that would be interpreted as philosophically autonomous but were nonetheless entangled with the theological background. On the other hand, we can also ask the theological side what would have become of Christianity without encountering Greek metaphysics. Indeed, something completely other, perhaps unthinkably other. Luther would not have been able to rediscover original Christianity without metaphysics because, to put it hermeneutically, this would have passed over the historical facticity of the matter. Hermeneutic philosophy must incorporate theology because it can do nothing else. The reverse also applies. The object of hermeneutics, the matter itself, is theological in such a way that it incorporates voices that the tradition that we are generates. Hermeneutics is not theology but must remain open to it.

A hermeneutics that finds itself “between” the divine and the human can reveal a modus existendi for the people of the age of interpretation. This “hermeneutics of between” of philosophy and theology wants to let the abundance of diverse voices come to speech to be able to address the drama of human existence with the acuteness that it deserves. Philosophy has lost its claim to speak from an absolute perspective in the hermeneutic age. Many arguments against the integration of theology into philosophy draw the false conclusion that if philosophy as “pure reason” is free from cultural entanglement, then it is also not subject to theology since this latter is always culturally conditioned with respect to its particular and historical belief community. Hermeneutics helps to recognize that Western philosophy is just as much a cultural phenomenon as Western theology. It is a kind of confession of faith in critical thinking, founded by Socrates, refined in the Middle Ages, and fully developed in the rational triumph of the Enlightenment. That this creed strives toward antinomy does not change its rootedness in culturally and theologically conditioned situations. Philosophy in the West is just as much a form of life or art of living as theology. This is an idea that existentialism rediscovered from the Greeks. If philosophy and theology are both forms of living (as Wittgenstein opined), neither has any a priori primacy over the other. Theology thus loses this privilege along with philosophy, yet one can speak with reference to the relation between them from a philosophical and a theological perspective. Two forms of living are speaking with one another. However, theology has something of which no philosophy can assure itself, namely, the authority of God. Philosophy has something that theology cannot have, skeptical freedom from authority. In our conversations, we must thus clearly distinguish between the theological and philosophical perspectives and recognize that the other view, theological or philosophical, remains ever possible. Such an understanding gives theology and philosophy the freedom to continue to develop themselves in dialogical independence from one another and to liberate themselves from the Idealism of a synthesis of the two disciplines. Only in becoming conscious of their differences can one retain a firm foundation for conversation between them. Like every other hermeneutic conversation, it comes to be a recognition of opposing indebtedness that has a transformative character.

As the art of understanding, hermeneutics stipulates that an undertaking like this integrates the theoretical dimension of the question with the factical. Theology is no mere academic discipline. It is a mode of our being-in-the-world. With certain reservations, the same can be said of philosophy. Not only are two disciplines colliding, but two alternative ways of being a human being are also observing each other with a suspicious eye so that the other constitutes a provocation and a threat of its peculiar belief and conception of reality. An important contribution of hermeneutics consists in that it precludes any rash problem-solving, independent of whether it concerns itself with a liberal synthesis of two different discourses or a post-liberal burial of antagonism between them. This perpetual dialogue admits of no ultimate conclusion. Indeed, it would be a bad hermeneutician who would think that he has the last word, must have the last word, or even could have the last word.

Academic positions 

 2022 – Professor of Liberal Arts, Faculty of Artes Liberales, University of Warsaw. 
 2022 – Visiting Professor, Interdisciplinary Studies Graduate Program, University of British Columbia, Vancouver, Canada
 2022 – Invited Honorary Professor in Philosophy, University of Coimbra, Faculty of Arts and Humanities, Department of Philosophy, Communication, and Information.
 2018 – Expert for Horizon 2020 ETHICS APPRAISAL SCHEME
 2018 – Expert for Life Sciences, the Alexander von Humboldt Foundation
 2016 – External Member of the Institute of Philosophy/Professor, University of Augsburg, Germany
 2015-2021 – Professor of General Education and Philosophy of Education, Faculty of Education, University of Warsaw
 2012 – Visiting Professor, Barrett, the Honors College and The New College of Interdisciplinary Arts and Sciences, Arizona State University, USA.
 2011/12 – Professor for Philosophy of Religion (Lehrstuhlvertretung for Prof. Dr. Dr. Markus Enders (Sabbatical leave)), Albert-Ludwigs-Universität in Freiburg i.Br.
 2009 – Research Professor in Hermeneutics, Instituto de Investigaciones Filologicas, Centro de Estudios Clasicos, Universidad Nacional Autónoma de México.
 2007 – 2016 Privatdozent/Professor for Philosophy of Religion at the Albert-Ludwigs-Universität in Freiburg i.Br.
 2002–2007 – Research Professor in Hermeneutics, University of Toronto, Canada.
 2001 –  President-Founder of the International Institute for Hermeneutics.

Selected bibliography

Monographs 

 Hermeneutics of Education: Exploring and Experiencing the Unpredictability of Education (Zürich: LIT Verlag, 2019).
 Existentia Hermeneutica: Understanding as the Mode of Being in the World (Zürich: LIT Verlag, 2019).
 Hermeneutics between Philosophy and Theology: The Imperative to Think the Incommensurable (Münster: LIT Verlag, 2010).
 Philosophizing with Gustav Siewerth: A New German Edition with Facing Translation of “Das Sein als Gleichnis Gottes”/“Being as Likeness of God,” And A Study, “From Metaphor and Indication to Icon: The Centrality of the Notion of Verbum in Hans-Georg Gadamer, Bernard Lonergan, and Gustav Siewerth" (Konstanz: Verlag Gustav Siewerth Gesellschaft, 2005).
 Inspired Metaphysics? Gustav Siewerth’s Hermeneutic Reading of the Onto-Theological Tradition (Toronto: The Hermeneutic Press, 2003).
 Das Miteinander: Grundzüge einer Sorge um den Menschen in seinem Unterwegssein (Guernsey: Elan & Son, 1997).
 Der Dichter in seinem Dichtersein: Versuch einer philosophisch-theologischen Deutung des Dichterseins am Beispiel von Czesław Miłosz (Frankfurt a.M.: Peter Lang, 1997).
 Die scholastischen Vorbedingungen der Metaphysik Gustav Siewerths: Eine historisch-kritische Studie mit Bezug auf die Seinsvergessenheitstheorie von Martin Heidegger (Frankfurt a.M.: Peter Lang, 1991).
 Scholastyczne uwarunkowania metafizyki Gustawa Siewertha: Studium historyczno-krytyczne w aspekcie teorii “niepamięci bytu” Martina Heideggera (Wadhurst: Elan & Son, 1990).
 Über die Differenz im Sein: Metaphysische Überlegungen zu Gustav Siewerths Werk (Frankfurt a.M.: Peter Lang, 1989).

Edited books 

 Klaudia Węc and Andrzej Wierciński, ed., Ryzyko jako warunek rozwoju: Transformatywne aspekty hermeneutyki edukacji, [Welcoming Risk as a Condition of Personal Growth and Development: Transformative Aspects of the Hermeneutics of Education] (Toruń: Wydawnictwo Adam Marszałek, 2017).

 Hermeneutics-Ethics-Education (Münster: LIT Verlag, 2015).
 Dariusz Skórczewski and Andrzej Wierciński, ed., Melancholia: The Disease of the Soul (Lublin: Wydawnictwo KUL, 2014).
 Heidegger and Hermeneutics, Studia Philosophiae Christianae 49 (2013) and 1 (2014).
 Maria Luisa Portocarrero, Luis Umbelino, and Andrzej Wierciński, ed., The Hermeneutic Rationality/La rationalité herméneutique (Münster: LIT Verlag, 2012).
 Gadamer’s Hermeneutics and the Art of Conversation (Münster: LIT Verlag, 2011).
 Sean McGrath and Andrzej Wierciński, ed., A Companion to Heidegger’s “Phenomenology of Religious Life” (Amsterdam: Rodopi, 2010).
 Edward Fiała, Dariusz Skórczewski, and Andrzej Wierciński, ed., Interpreting the Self: Hermeneutics, Psychoanalysis, and Literary Studies (Lublin: Katolicki Uniwersytet Lubelski, 2009).
 Between Description and Interpretation: The Hermeneutic Turn in Phenomenology (Toronto: The Hermeneutic Press, 2005).
 Between Friends: The Hans Urs von Balthasar and Gustav Siewerth Correspondence (1954-1963): A Bilingual Edition, ed. and trans. Andrzej Wierciński (Konstanz: Verlag Gustav Siewerth Gesellschaft, 2005).
 Jan Sochoń and Andrzej Wierciński, ed., Studia z Filozofii Boga, religii i człowieka, vol. 3: Filozofia wobec tajemnic wiecznych 3 (2005).
 Between Suspicion and Sympathy: Paul Ricoeur’s Unstable Equilibrium (Toronto: The Hermeneutic Press, 2003).
 Between the Human and the Divine: Philosophical and Theological Hermeneutics (Toronto: The Hermeneutic Press, 2002).

Interview with Andrzej Wiercinski 
"We Must Interpret: The Hermeneutic Retrieval of the Philosophical Tradition, Andrzej Wiercinski in Conversation with Boyd Blundell"

References

External links 
 Faculty of Artes Liberales, University of Warsaw
 The International Institute for Hermeneutics
 Analecta Hermeneutica
 International Studies in Hermeneutics and Phenomenology
 Nauka Polska

1961 births
20th-century Polish Roman Catholic priests
21st-century Polish Roman Catholic priests
Continental philosophers
Hermeneutists
Heidegger scholars
Philosophers of education
Academic staff of the University of Freiburg
Living people